The lawn bowls competition at the 1994 Commonwealth Games took place at the Juan de Fuca Bowling Club in Victoria, British Columbia, Canada from 18 August until 28 August 1994.

Medal table

Medallists

Para sport

Results

Men's singles – round robin

Section A

Section B 

+ Awarded Bronze medals

Final 
 Corsie bt  Allcock 25-20

Men's pairs – round robin

Section A

Section B 

+ Awarded Bronze medals

Final 
 Australia bt  Wales 18-14

Men's Fours – round robin

Section A

Section B 

+ Awarded Bronze medals

Final 
 South Africa bt  Australia 21-18

Women's singles – round robin

Section A

Section B 

+ Awarded Bronze medals

Final 
 Johnston bt  Jones 25-17

Women's pairs – round robin

Section A

Section B 

+ Awarded Bronze medals

Final 
 Scotland bt  South Africa 32-18

Women's Fours – round robin

Section A

Section B 

+ Awarded Bronze medals

Final 
 South Africa bt  Papua New Guinea 24-17

References

See also
List of Commonwealth Games medallists in lawn bowls
Lawn bowls at the Commonwealth Games

1994 Commonwealth Games events
Lawn bowls at the Commonwealth Games
1994 in bowls